Chew toys are toys designed to be chewed on by animals for stimulation and boredom relief. Gnawing on a chew toy can be soothing to an animal, as well as stimulating. In young animals, such as puppies, chew toys can help relieve pain associated with teething. There are several types of chew toys, made from materials including rawhide, wood, paper, and mineral. Chew toys are commonly associated with  dogs, but have been found to be effective with; birds, rodents, and rabbits.

In addition to providing entertainment, chew toys can help an animal relieve its anxiety, distract animals from chewing on other "forbidden" items, and assist in maintaining healthy teeth and gums.

Human infants are given a similar toy called a teether, to help soothe inflamed gums during teething.

Rawhide

Rawhide chew toys are suitable for all animals except herbivores, as it is made of animal skin. For example, rabbits cannot have rawhide toys because their digestive systems cannot process them. Rawhide chew toys are sturdy and can withstand weeks or months of wear before they are rendered unusable.  Examples of rawhide chew toys are twists and rawhide bones. Chew toys made of leather, tanned rawhide, are not recommended for dogs as they cannot be properly digested in the stomach, and risk causing a blockage in the intestines.

Wooden
Wooden chew toys are made of soft, non-poisonous wood, and are often coated in bright, vegetable-based dyes or paints. These chew toys are considered to be a safe alternative to the wood that a small animal would find in the wild, and so are often recommended if the owner has no knowledge of the trees and shrubs growing in the area. They are generally used by rabbits and small rodents. Wooden chew toys help to keep teeth trimmed down, preventing eating difficulties and reducing the need for trips to a vet for teeth clipping. An example of a wooden chew toy is the commercial product toy ropes.

Cheese Dog Chew 
Cheese Dog Chews, or Chhurpi, are made from yak milk, cow milk, lime, and salt. These chews are recommended to those dog parents who want their dogs to chew on toys that are not made from artificial materials like rubber or plastic. These are usually available in stick form or as puffed-up treats. These edible chews tend to be hard and dogs often take a long time to finish these.

Paper
Paper chew toys are made of non-bleached, non-toxic paper. They are inexpensive or often freely available. One common paper chew toy is an empty toilet paper tube. These can double as tunnels for very small rodents, and can also be used as modified piñatas for larger small animals. Wadded-up newspaper pages, old spineless books, and the commercial product Chubes are other commonly used paper chew toys.

Mineral
Mineral chew toys are made of flavored animal-safe minerals. These range from flavored fruit-shaped blocks for birds to ice-cream cone-shaped mineral treats for rabbits. They also come shaped like bowls with fluffy minerals inside. A common mineral chew toy is the cuttlebone, a toy for birds that helps to keep nails and beaks trimmed and healthy.

Rubber

There are a variety of rubber chew toys for dogs on the market that are molded into different shapes. Some are hollowed so that treats can be placed in them. This way, the dog has to "work" to get rewarded with a treat. A criticism of rubber chew toys is that some of these chew toys are not hygienic and harbor harmful bacteria.

References

Pet equipment
Toys